Taeniotes marmoratus is a species of beetle in the family Cerambycidae. It was described by James Thomson in 1865. It is known from Ecuador.

References

marmoratus
Beetles described in 1865